

Events
January 5 – Max Bruch's Violin Concerto no. 1 in G minor is first performed in its revised version by Joseph Joachim in Bremen with Karl Martin Rheinthaler conducting.
February 3 – Pyotr Ilyich Tchaikovsky's Symphony No. 1 ("Winter Daydreams") is first performed in Moscow at a Russian Musical Society concert (having been premièred in Saint Petersburg).
April 10 (Good Friday) – The six movement version of Brahms' A German Requiem (Ein deutsches Requiem) is premièred in Bremen Cathedral with Brahms conducting and Julius Stockhausen as the baritone soloist.  
June 21 – Richard Wagner's opera Die Meistersinger von Nürnberg debuts at the Königliches Hof- und National-Theater, Munich with Hans von Bülow conducting.
August 15 – Teatro Giuseppe Verdi opens in Busseto, Italy.
October – Modest Mussorgsky begins work on his opera Boris Godunov, which is completed six years later.
December 21 – The newly rebuilt Gaiety Theatre, London (in the West End) reopens with operatic parodies, including the burlesque Robert the Devil, or The Nun, the Dun, and the Son of a Gun, setting new lyrics by W. S. Gilbert to popular continental opera tunes.
Aristide Cavaillé-Coll's organ at Notre-Dame de Paris is dedicated.
Edvard Grieg writes his Piano Concerto while staying on Zealand.

Published popular music
 "Captain Jinks"
 "Come Back To Erin" by Claribel
 "Crown Him with Many Crowns" w. Matthew Bridges (1851) m. George Job Elvey (1868)
 "Her Bright Smile Haunts Me Still" w. J.E. Carpenter  m. W.T. Wrighton
 "I Cannot Sing The Old Songs"      w.m. Claribel  
 "Little Footsteps" w. Michael Bennett Leavitt  m. James A. Barney
 "The Man on the Flying Trapeze" by George Leybourne, Gaston Lyle, & Alfred Lee (first published the previous year)
 "The Sweet By and By" w. S. Fillmore m. Joseph P. Webster
 "Walking In The Zoo"  w. Hugh Willoughby Sweny  m. Alfred Lee
 "What a Friend We Have in Jesus" w. Joseph M. Scriven (1855) m. Charles C. Converse (1868)
 "The Whispering Hope" by Septimus Winner
 "The Widow In The Cottage By The Sea"     w.m. Charles A. White
 "Yield Not To Temptation" w.m. Horatio R. Palmer

Classical music
Jean-Baptiste Accolay – Concerto for Violin No. 1 in A minor
Georges Bizet – Variations chromatiques de concert for piano
Ignaz Brüll – Piano Concerto No. 2 in C, op. 24
Johannes Brahms – Ein deutsches Requiem, op. 45
Peter Tchaikovsky 
Songs Without Words
Fatum

Opera

Arrigo Boito – Mefistofele
Gaetano Braga – Ruy Blas
John Thomas Douglass – Virginia's Ball performed (once) at the  Stuyvesant Institute on Broadway in New York City, generally regarded as the first opera written by a black composer
Gialdino Gialdini – Rosmunda premiered March 5 at the Teatro Pergola, Florence
Jacques Offenbach – The Island of Tulipatan
Richard Wagner – Die Meistersinger von Nürnberg, premièred in the Königliches Hof- und National-Theater, Munich

Musical theatre
 La Belle Hélène (Music by Jacques Offenbach  Libretto by Henri Meilhac and Ludovic Halévy) New York production opened at Pike's Opera House on November 2 and ran for 14 performances
 Ixion Broadway production opened at Wood's Museum and Metropolitan on September 28 and ran for 120 performances.  Starring Lydia Thompson.
 The White Fawn Broadway production opened at Niblo's Garden on January 17 and ran for 176 performances

Births
 January 6 – Vittorio Monti, Italian violinist, composer and conductor (d. 1922)
 January 26 – Juventino Rosas, composer, band leader (d. 1894)
 April 13 – John Blackwood McEwen, composer, educator (d. 1948)
 April 19 – Max von Schillings, composer, conductor (d. 1933)
 April 22 – José Vianna da Motta, composer, pianist (d. 1948)
 July 19 – Florence Foster Jenkins, soprano (d. 1944)
 August 7 – Granville Bantock, composer (d. 1946)
 August 21 – Vess Ossman, ragtime banjo player (d. 1923)
 September 8 – Seth Weeks, African American jazz mandolinist, composer, arranger and bandleader (d. 1953)
 September 12 – Jan Brandts Buys, composer (d. 1933)
 November 30 – Ernest Newman, critic (d. 1959)
 Early? (or November 24?) – Scott Joplin, African American ragtime composer, pianist (d. 1917)

Deaths
January 3 – Moritz Hauptmann, composer (b. 1792)
February 25 – Sophie Schröder, actress and singer (b. 1781)
March 2 – Carl Eberwein, composer (b. 1786)
April 3 – Franz Berwald, composer (b. 1796)
April 26 – Karel Strakatý, singer (b. 1804)
June 5 – Anselm Hüttenbrenner, composer (b. 1794)
July 6 – Samuel Lover, songwriter (b. 1797)
August 11 – Halfdan Kjerulf, composer (b. 1815)
November 13 – Gioacchino Rossini, composer (b. 1792)
November 25 – Franz Brendel, music critic (b. 1811)
December 23 – Karl Ferdinand Adam, composer and cantor (b. 1806)
date unknown
Berl Broder, singer and troubadour (b. 1815)
Erik Jonsson Helland, Hardanger fiddle maker (b. 1816)

References

 
19th century in music
Music by year